Jouko Salakka (born 10 August 1951) is a Finnish speed skater. He competed in four events at the 1972 Winter Olympics.

References

External links
 

1951 births
Living people
Finnish male speed skaters
Olympic speed skaters of Finland
Speed skaters at the 1972 Winter Olympics
People from Somero
Sportspeople from Southwest Finland